Wreck-It Ralph is a Disney media franchise primarily consisting of an animated comedy film series produced by Walt Disney Animation Studios and released by Walt Disney Pictures. The series tells the story of the eponymous arcade game villain named Wreck-It Ralph, who rebels against his "bad guy" role and dreams of becoming a hero. The series has grossed $1 billion worldwide.

The series is notable for featuring cameos of characters from licensed properties including video games and various Disney franchises.

Premise
Wreck-It Ralph takes places within the arcade machines at Litwak's Arcade. After hours, the various characters in the games are able to socialize in their shared power strip. However, these characters know they cannot stray far from their games when the arcade reopens, or else the game will be considered broken and sent off for disposal by Mr. Litwak. This had happened to racing game character Turbo years earlier, affecting both his game and the one he sabotaged. The titular character is Wreck-It Ralph, from a game called Fix-It Felix, Jr.. In his game, Ralph is the antagonist of the game and aims to wreck an apartment skyscraper, but is always stopped by the game's protagonist, Fix-It Felix, Jr.. Through events in the first film, Ralph makes friends with Vanellope von Schweetz, a character from the game Sugar Rush, while Felix becomes romantically attached to Sergeant Tamora Jean Calhoun, from the game Hero's Duty.

Films

Wreck-It Ralph (2012)

The 52nd Disney animated feature film. Ralph, desiring to be the hero, sneaks into Hero's Duty to steal the hero medal there, but inadvertently fires himself off in an escape ship when attacked by a Cy-Bug, one of the game's enemies, through the power strip, and into Sugar Rush, where he meets Vanellope for the first time. Vanellope is a glitch within the game who wants to become a playable character, and Ralph helps her along, forming a bond between them. Felix and Calhoun team up to find Ralph before Fix-It Felix, Jr. is to be unplugged, and before the Cy-Bug can reproduce in Sugar Rush and destroy the game. Ralph discovers that the population of Sugar Rush has been suppressed by King Candy, who is really Turbo; not only had he managed to escape into Sugar Rush, but also rewrote part of Vanellope's code, displacing her as the game's main character. Ralph, Vanellope, Felix, and Calhoun work together and defeat Turbo and the Cy-Bugs, saving both Sugar Rush and the arcade and later sparing Fix-It Felix, Jr. from being unplugged. Ralph is finally recognized as a hero, and happily returns to his duties in his game, while Vanellope enjoys her new popularity among the arcade players.

Ralph Breaks the Internet (2018)

The 57th animated film produced by the studio, and the sequel to the 2012 film Wreck-It Ralph. Six years after the events of the first film, Sugar Rushs racing wheel is damaged, and due to the company that produced Sugar Rush going defunct years earlier, Mr. Litwak plans to take the game away for spare parts. Ralph and Vanellope learn of a replacement wheel from eBay, and use a new Internet router in the arcade to travel to the Internet to get it, while the recently married Felix and Calhoun stay to make sure the Sugar Rush characters have a temporary home. Ralph and Vanellope successfully win the auction but do not have the funds to get it, and look for job opportunities. When Ralph finds a way to earn all the funds by becoming a viral video star with the help of Yesss, he discovers that Vanellope may want to stay in the gritty racing game Slaughter Race and not return to the arcade thanks to Shank, a character from that game. This prompts Ralph to use a dark web virus to shut down the game and save Vanellope, only for the virus to turn on Ralph's own insecure feelings and start propagating through the Internet and destroying it. Ralph, Vanellope, and their newfound allies are able to stop the virus in time after Ralph accepts the fact that Vanellope wants to move on. The two say their goodbyes and Ralph returns to the arcade just as Sugar Rush is plugged back in. The two keep in contact, however, and Vanellope promises that she will eventually return to live in the arcade once Shank has taught her every trick she can use in Sugar Rush.

Future
Directors Rich Moore and Phil Johnston said that a Ralph Breaks the Internet spin-off film focusing on the Disney Princesses could be made depending on the audience's response and "if there's a good story to be told". Also, John C. Reilly says that he has an idea for a third sequel, which would see Ralph and Vanellope "beaming themselves right out into space".

Video games

Wreck-It Ralph (2012)

In 2012, a video game of the same name was released alongside the first film for the DS, Wii, and 3DS. Most of the principal cast from the film reprised their roles with the exception of John C. Reily as Wreck-it-Ralph who was replaced by Brian T. Delaney.

Taking place after the events of the film, the game follows Ralph and Felix as they traverse through Fix-It Felix Jr., Hero's Duty, and Sugar Rush in an attempt to stop a new army of Cy-Bugs that hatched during one of Vanellope's races.

Wreck-It Ralph: Ralph Breaks VR (2018)
A VR arcade experience called Wreck-It Ralph: Ralph Breaks VR opened at The Void locations in 2018, along with the second film.

Other titles

Disney Universe

The travellers can acquire a costume based on Wreck-It Ralph.

Sonic & All-Stars Racing Transformed

Wreck-It Ralph appears as a playable character in the 2012 video game Sonic & All-Stars Racing Transformed.

Disney Infinity series

Wreck-It Ralph and Vanellope feature in the 2013 toys-to-life video game Disney Infinity. The characters are playable via toys available in both single packs and a "Toy Box" pack that adds locations and elements from the original film to the game's "Toy Box" mode. The toys are also compatible with the game's sequels, 2014's Disney Infinity 2.0 and 2015's Disney Infinity 3.0.

Disney Magic Kingdoms

Content of Wreck-It Ralph was included in the world builder video game Disney Magic Kingdoms, in a limited time Event focused on Ralph Breaks the Internet, with Ralph, Vanellope, Felix, Caulhoun, Yesss, Shank and Spamley as playable characters, along with some attractions based on locations of the film. KnowsMore also appears a non-player character within The Internet attraction. Gord was also included as a playable character in a later update of the game. The game also includes costumes for the Disney Princesses based on their comfy clothes from Ralph Breaks the Internet. In the game the characters are involved in new storylines that serve as a continuation of the events of Ralph Breaks the Internet.

Kingdom Hearts series

Wreck-It Ralph appears in the 2019 video game Kingdom Hearts III as a Link. When summoned, he will place explosive blocks and destroy them, causing damage to nearby enemies. A world based on Wreck-It Ralph was added to the 2017 mobile game Kingdom Hearts Union χ as part of an update in April 2019. The world adapts the events of the original film.

Cast

Crew

Reception

Box office

Critical and public response

Accolades 
Both films were nominated for the Academy Award for Best Animated Feature, but the first film lost to Brave, while the second film lost to Spider-Man: Into the Spider-Verse. The first film won the Critics' Choice Movie Award for Best Animated Feature, and the second film was nominated. Both films were nominated for the Golden Globe Award for Best Animated Feature Film.

In other media
Ralph and Vanellope make background cameo appearances in The Fairly OddParents episode "Dumbbell Curve", in the foreground of a crowd shot depicting a city cheering. Ralph also makes a brief appearance in the Futurama episode "Murder on the Planet Express", on a passing truck and arcade machine, while Vanellope is briefly featured in the El Goonish Shive arc "End of an Era", where character Susan uses their appearance as a digital avatar. Ralph also makes a cameo appearance in The Simpsons short film Plusaversary, as a bodyguard along with Maui from Moana.

Music 
The soundtrack to Wreck-It Ralph was released on October 30, 2012.

The soundtrack to Ralph Breaks the Internet was released on November 16, 2018.

Notes

References 

Wreck-It Ralph
Film series introduced in 2012
English-language films
Animated film series
Walt Disney Studios (division) franchises
Comedy film franchises
Works set in computers
Children's film series
American children's animated adventure films